The Partnership for Prosperity and Security in the Caribbean (PPS) is a regional-level dialogue with the stated purpose of providing greater cooperation on security and economic issues. The Partnership was founded in Bridgetown, Barbados on March 10, 1997 by the Governments of the United States of America, Antigua and Barbuda, the Commonwealth of The Bahamas, Barbados, Belize, the Commonwealth of Dominica,  the Dominican Republic, Grenada, the Co-operative Republic of Guyana, the Republic of Haiti, Jamaica, the Federation of St. Kitts and Nevis, Saint Lucia, St. Vincent and the Grenadines, the Republic of Suriname and the Republic of Trinidad and Tobago.

The major areas covered under the agreement are trade, development, finance, the environment, justice, and security. As part of agreement, the heads agree to pledge their confidence and support in the establishment of the Free Trade Area of the Americas (FTAA) and adhering to the goals of World Trade Organization (WTO) as well as the multi-lateral agenda of security in the Caribbean region. The agreement also sets out a basis for helping the Caribbean countries combat the HIV/AIDS epidemic and for trans-regional illegal-drug interdiction cooperation with the United States.

Political signees

Notes

See also 
Third Border Initiative
Caribbean Basin Initiative (CBI)
Caribbean Basin Trade Partnership Act (CBTPA)
Free Trade Area of the Americas
Caribbean Community (CARICOM)
Caribbean Regional Maritime Agreement
Security and Prosperity Partnership of North America (SPP)

References 
Partnership for Prosperity and Security in the Caribbean (PDF) The Bridgetown Declaration of Principles - Caribbean/United States Summit, 10 May 1997, CARICOMLaw.org

External links 
Caribbean Community (CARICOM) Implementation Agency for Crime and Security (IMPACS)
U.S.-Caribbean Relations Written by Cedric Grant, Clark Atlanta University - Volume 5, Number 19 July 2000

1997 establishments in North America
United States–Caribbean relations
United States–North American relations